Silver Falls Airport  is located  south of Silver Falls, Manitoba, Canada.

See also
Silver Falls Water Aerodrome

References

Registered aerodromes in Manitoba

Transport in Eastman Region, Manitoba